Greatest Hits is a 1964 greatest hits album, the first for American R&B-soul singer Marvin Gaye, released on the Tamla label. Released during Gaye's first period of success, it was also his first charted album as a solo artist after making his album chart debut with the Mary Wells duet album, Together, the same year. 

Three of the singles, "Sandman", "Can I Get a Witness" (also featuring that song's B-side, "I'm Crazy 'bout My Baby"), and "You're a Wonderful One", were non-album tracks that made it to release on this particular album.

Track listing

Side one
"Can I Get a Witness" (Brian Holland, Lamont Dozier, Eddie Holland) – 2:46
"You're a Wonderful One" (Holland, Dozier, Holland) – 2:48
"Stubborn Kind of Fellow" (Marvin Gaye, George Gordy, Mickey Stevenson) – 2:45
"I'm Crazy 'bout My Baby" (Stevenson) – 2:43
"Pride and Joy" (Gaye, Norman Whitfield, Stevenson) – 2:08
"Hitch Hike" (Gaye, Clarence Paul, Stevenson) – 2:30

Side two
"Sandman" (Pat Ballard) – 2:31
"Hello There Angel" (Stevenson, Berry Gordy) – 2:44
"One of These Days" (Stevenson) – 2:59
"I'm Yours, You're Mine" (Stevenson, Gordy) – 1:55
"Taking My Time" (Stevenson, Gordy) – 2:29
"It Hurt Me Too" (Gaye, Stevenson, Ricardo) – 2:43

Personnel
Marvin Gaye – lead vocals, piano, drums
Martha and the Vandellas – background vocals
The Temptations – background vocals
The Supremes – background vocals
Four Tops – background vocals
Holland–Dozier–Holland – background vocals
The Andantes – background vocals
The Miracles – background vocals
The Funk Brothers – instrumentation

Albums produced by Brian Holland
Albums produced by Lamont Dozier
Albums produced by William "Mickey" Stevenson
1964 greatest hits albums
Marvin Gaye compilation albums
Tamla Records compilation albums
Albums recorded at Hitsville U.S.A.